

Skakjung or Kokzhung is 45–kilometer long pasture land along the Indus River valley in Southern Ladakh. It is traditionally used by nomads of nearby villages such as Chushul and Nyoma as well as Rupshu. The Skakung pasture land can be used year-round because it rarely snows in the Indus Valley.

According to Ladakhi Indian diplomat Phunchok Stobdan, Skakjung went from being an Indian-administered area until the mid-1980s to a completely Chinese-administered area by 2008.

See also

 Demchok sector
  Indo-China Border Roads

Notes

References

Bibliography 
 
 

Territorial disputes of India